1853 in archaeology

Explorations
 Alexander Cunningham examines and describes the ruins at Harappa in the Punjab
 John Thurnam begins investigating tumuli around Knap Hill in Wiltshire, England

Excavations

Finds
 Hormuzd Rassam excavates the clay tablets which will be deciphered as Epic of Gilgamesh
 Winter 1853–54 – Archaeologist Ferdinand Keller identifies the remains of the Meilen–Rorenhaab site, first of the prehistoric pile dwellings around Lake Zurich to be located.

Births
 June 3 – Flinders Petrie, English Egyptologist (d. 1942)
 December 26 – Wilhelm Dörpfeld, German architect and archaeologist (d. 1940)

Deaths
 June 8 – Howard Vyse, English soldier and Egyptologist (b. 1784)
 Charles Masson, British explorer of Buddhist sites (b. 1800)

See also
 List of years in archaeology
 1852 in archaeology
 1854 in archaeology

References

Archaeology
Archaeology by year
Archaeology
Archaeology